The Party Of National Unity and Progress is a political party in Zambia. The party was originally launched in Lusaka in May 2017 as the Party of National Unity (PNU), but later relaunched and rebranded as the Party of National Unity and Progress (PNUP) in January 2021.

The party is led by economist Highvie Hamududu. In the 2021 Zambian general election, PNUP won a single seat in the National Assembly in the constituency of Nalolo.

Electoral history

Presidential elections

National Assembly elections

References 

2017 establishments in Zambia
Political parties established in 2017
Political parties in Zambia